SVF Entertainment Pvt. Ltd.  is an Indian media and entertainment company headquartered in Kolkata, West Bengal, founded by Shrikant Mohta. Apart from producing and distributing Bengali films, SVF also distributes Bollywood and Hollywood films in Eastern India. The other divisions of the company include Exhibition, TV Content Production, Digital Cinema, Music, New Media and IPR syndication. SVF was in Anandabazar Patrika's powerlist for 2008 and 2010.

Background 
SVF Entertainment Pvt. Ltd. was founded in 1995 by Shrikant Mohta and Mahendra Soni. They started off as distributors of Hindi films like Bekaar Ka Number, Khamoshi in Eastern India. Their first film production is in 1996, Bhai Amar Bhai starring Prosenjit Chatterjee and Chiranjeet Chakraborty. Directed by Swapan Saha, it became a blockbuster. Later, they produced the Prosenjit Chatterjee starrer Sasurbari Zindabad in 2000 which became the highest-grossing Bengali movie until then. They followed it up with successful films like Sathi (2002), I Love You (2007), Chirodini ...Tumi Je Aamar (2008) etc. Along with commercial entertainers they have also backed experimental films by directors like Rituparno Ghosh, Kaushik Ganguly, Srijit Mukherji, Sandip Ray, Dhrubo Banerjee.

In the film entertainment space, SVF has the following divisions: Production, Television, Distribution, Music, Digital Cinema, Exhibition and New Media.

Film production 
SVF Entertainment Pvt. Ltd. is one of the biggest integrated production houses in Eastern India. So far it has produced more than 120 films including National Award winning films like Memories in March, Chokher Bali and Raincoat, Chotoder Chobi,   Ek Je Chhilo Raja, Gumnaami, blockbusters like Sasurbari Zindabad, Sathi, Minister Fatakeshto, Champion, Jackpot, Chirodini Tumi Je Amar, Paran Jai Jaliya Re, Josh, Awara, Guptodhoner Sondhane, Ek Je Chhilo Raja, Durgeshgorer Guptodhon, Chander Pahar and Amazon Obhijaan, critically acclaimed films like Autograph, Iti Mrinalini, Memories in March, Baishe Srabon, Hemlock Society, Chitrangada: The Crowning Wish, Uma, Byomkesh Gotro, Guptodhoner Sondhane, Durgeshgorer Guptodhon and Golondaaj.

Digital cinema 
In January 2008, SVF Entertainment Pvt Ltd. entered a partnership with Real Image Media Technologies to bring their Qube Digital Cinema technology to Eastern India.

Television 
In the television space, SVF has co-promoted Media Worldwide Limited and its four leading channels: Music India, Sangeet Bangla, Sangeet Bhojpuri, Sangeet Marathi and Music India UK. The company has also produced prime-time shows for Zee Bangla, Star Jalsha, Colors Bangla, Rupashi Bangla, Mahua Bangla, Sananda TV. Some of the popular shows include Trinayani, Bojhena Se Bojhena, Goyenda Ginni, Maa....Tomay Chara Ghum Ashena, Behula, Durga, Bandhan, I Love You, Sindoorkhela, Janmantar, Mrs Singha Roy, Bisharjan, Sangsar Sukher Hoy Ramanir Guney, Bodhu Kon Alo Laglo Chokhe, Bhootu, Dashi, Anurager Chhowa and many others.

Awards

Music videos and movies
SVF has a YouTube channel called SVF Music where music singles like Mitthey Kotha, Bolo Dugga Maiki, Amar Chalaki, O Mon Re  etc., and songs of the films produced by it and other production companies.

It also has a YouTube channel called SVF Movies where movies and short films like Amar Bodyguard, Encounter, Karunamoyee, Iti Kunti, Network and others are broadcast.

Films

TV shows

References

External links 
 Shree Venkatesh Films at IMDb

Entertainment companies of India
Companies based in Kolkata
Mass media companies established in 1996
Producers who won the Best Film on Other Social Issues National Film Award
Film production companies of India
1996 establishments in West Bengal
Indian companies established in 1996